Muna Regency (Kabupaten Muna) is a regency of Southeast Sulawesi Province of Indonesia, covering parts of the island of Muna as well as part of the neighbouring Buton Island and smaller islands off its coast. Until 2014 it had an area of 2,945.05 km2, but in that year the western eleven  districts of that Regency were split off to form a new West Muna Regency. The reduced regency now covers an area of 2,057.69 km2, and the districts comprising that area had a population of 196,645 at the 2010 Census; the total at the 2020 Census was 215,527, and the official estimate as at mid 2021 was 218,956, comprising 107,439 males and 111,517 females. The principal town lies at Raha, in Katobu District.

Administration 
The Muna Regency was divided until 2014 into 33 districts (kecamatan), but following the separation of the eleven districts in the west of the island, the remaining twenty-two districts are tabulated below with their areas and their populations at the 2010 Census and the 2020 Census, together with the official estimates as at mid 2021. Eight of the districts lie in the centre of the island, nine lie on its northeast coast (or on islands to the north of that coast) and five lie across the strait on the northwest coast of Buton Island. The table also includes the locations of the district administrative centres, the number of villages (rural desa and urban kelurahan) within each district, and its postal code. The capital, Raha, lies in Katobu District, in which all 8 component villages are rated as kelurahan, but its urban area encompasses adjacent districts.

Notes:
 (a) Tongkuno District includes 43 small islands.
 (b) Lohia District includes 87 small islands.
 (c) Duruka District includes 4 small islands.
 (d) Napabalano District includes 6 small islands.
 (e) Towea is a group of islands off the north coast of Muna.
 (f) the five last-named above lie on the west coast of Buton Island, not on Muna Island. Pasir Putih District includes 3 small islands and Wakorumba Seletan District includes 2 small islands.

References

Regencies of Southeast Sulawesi